Vernard Arthur Hoscheit (April 1, 1922 – June 11, 2007) was an American professional baseball catcher, coach, and manager. He served as a coach on four World Series championship Major League Baseball (MLB) teams with the Oakland Athletics and New York Mets. Hoscheit was the Mets' bullpen coach from 1984 to 1987, which included their World Series championship run in 1986. During that season's spring training, he accurately predicted that the team would clinch the National League East Division title on September 17, long before any regular season game was even played.

Career

Playing 
Born in Brunswick, Nebraska, Hoscheit originally signed with the New York Yankees and was a catcher in their farm system for 12 seasons, starting in 1941. He missed the 1943–45 seasons because of World War II military service, but returned to hit .245 for the Binghamton Triplets in the Class A Eastern League, where his manager was Baseball Hall of Fame pitcher Lefty Gomez. Hoscheit also caught 25 games in 1947 for Binghamton while hitting .271. He hung on in the minor leagues until 1955, his best season being 1951, when he hit .354 with 11 home runs and 109 RBIs for the McAlester Rockets of Class D Sooner State League. Hoscheit managed in the lower levels of the Yankees' organization from 1948 to 1959.

Coaching and management 
Hoscheit also was an executive in minor league baseball. He was the general manager for the Quincy (1955–56), Peoria (1957), and Greensboro (1958–59) clubs, concurrent with being their field manager, and then became president of the Three-I League in 1960.

After the Three-I League disbanded following the 1961 season, Hoscheit joined the Baltimore Orioles and was a scout and minor league instructor (1962–67) and Major League coach (1968). He switched to Oakland and was a coach from 1969 to 1974, earning World Series rings in his final three seasons.

He coached for the California Angels (1976) and was the Mets' Gulf Coast League manager in 1983. With the parent team, he served as bullpen coach when New York won the 1986 World Series. He became a minor league catching instructor for the Mets in 1988.

In retirement, Hoscheit returned to his native Nebraska, where he coached American Legion teams in Plainview, Nebraska for many years including a state championship team in 1982. In 1983, he returned to the Mets to become their Gulf Coast League Manager in 1983 and went on to receive his 4th World Series Ring with the 1986 Mets as a bullpen coach

Death 
He died at the Pierce Manor nursing home in Pierce, Nebraska on June 11, 2007.

References

External links

Vern Hoscheit at SABR (Baseball BioProject)

1922 births
2007 deaths
Baltimore Orioles coaches
Baltimore Orioles scouts
Baseball catchers
Baseball coaches from Nebraska
Baseball players from Nebraska
Binghamton Triplets players
California Angels coaches
Joplin Miners players
Kansas City Blues (baseball) players
Major League Baseball bullpen coaches
McAlester Rockets players
Minor league baseball executives
Minor league baseball managers
New York Mets coaches
Norfolk Tars players
Oakland Athletics coaches
People from Antelope County, Nebraska
People from Plainview, Nebraska
Quincy Gems players
American military personnel of World War II